Gazis (derived from the Arabic Ghazi) is a Greek surname. It is the surname of:
 Anthimos Gazis (1758–1828), Greek philosopher.
 Georgios Gazis (born 1981), Greek amateur boxer.
 Nikolaos Gazis, Greek politician and MEP.
 Theodoros Gazis (1398–1475), Greek humanist and translator of Aristotle.

Greek-language surnames
Surnames